This is a list of Bien de Interés Cultural landmarks in the Province of Ávila, Spain.
 Basilica of San Vicente
 Iglesia-convento de Santa Teresa
 Roman bridge of Ávila
 Walls of Ávila
 Medina Bridge

References 

 
Avila